Ciudad CCS is a newspaper published in Caracas, Venezuela. It was launched on 8 August 2009 by Jorge Rodríguez, mayor of the Libertador Bolivarian Municipality of Caracas for PSUV. It is a free newspaper funded by the municipality.

References

See also
 List of newspapers in Venezuela

Newspapers published in Venezuela
Publications established in 2009
Bolivarian Communication and Information System
2009 establishments in Venezuela
Socialist newspapers